Motion Notion is an annual underground electronic dance music and transformational festival located in the Rocky Mountains near Golden, BC, Canada. Started in 2000, it is one of Western Canada's longest running annual outdoor electronic dance music festivals. Originally a single night event, the festival has grown to be a four night event, usually held over a weekend towards the end of July. The event features three festival sponsored stages (The Temple, Cabana, and Spectrum) and allows for up to four independently operated and funded stages.

Music 
Motion Notion formed its roots in the rave and festival scene with psychedelic trance, techno, house music, drum and bass, downtempo, dubstep, and breakbeat.

List of some of the notable headlining artists who have performed at Motion Notion:
 Infected Mushroom
 Shpongle
 The Crystal Method
 Amon Tobin
 Dirtyphonics
 Excision (musician)
 Datsik (musician)
 Noisia
 David Tipper

History 
The first Motion Notion was held in a warehouse in Calgary, Alberta, in 2000.

Partly as a result of the City of Calgary's extended dance bylaw, and a change in direction to host outdoor events rather than indoor, Motion Notion moved out of the city to a rural setting.

Subsequent years saw the festival move to various sites around Western Alberta, including Nojack, Evansburg and Drayton Valley.

The festival then moved to Golden, BC, which would remain its home for many years.

In 2018, organizers announced the festival would be moving to Merritt, BC, where it was held that year. For various reasons the festival was put on hold and then cancelled in 2019.

Location 

The 2018 Motion Notion festival was held on the Coldwater Fields Festival Grounds located in Merritt, British Columbia.

References 

Music festivals in British Columbia
Electronic music festivals in Canada
Music festivals established in 2000
2000 establishments in British Columbia